Qaqasiralaq Kullualik, also known as Kakasilala Koodluarlik, (1913-1983) was an Inuit artist.

Their work is included in the collections of the National Gallery of Canada, the Winnipeg Art Gallery and the Bowers Museum.

References

1913 births
1983 deaths
20th-century Canadian artists
Inuit artists